Christopher Edward Barnwell (born March 1, 1979) is a Canadian American former professional baseball infielder. He played for the Milwaukee Brewers of the Major League Baseball (MLB).

College
Chris was a collegiate standout at now-NCAA Div. II Flagler College in Florida from 1998 to 2001. He had his number "5" retired in 2007. He is the first Flagler baseball player to reach the Major Leagues. He is Flagler's career leader in at-bats, hits, singles, doubles, runs batted in, and assists.

Professional Baseball Career

Milwaukee Brewers
Barnwell was drafted by the Milwaukee Brewers in the 25th round of the 2001 Major League Baseball draft. He began the 2001 season at the Milwaukee Brewers' rookie league affiliate, the Ogden Raptors. He was awarded the Coaches Award in 2001. He started 2002 at their Single-A Beloit Snappers, and was promoted to their High-A High Desert Mavericks during the season. Barnwell played at the Brewers Double-A Huntsville Stars during 2003 and 2004, and the beginning of 2005. Early in the season, he was promoted to the Triple-A Nashville Sounds. He started the 2006 season in Nashville before being called up to Milwaukee to make his major league debut on June 20, 2006, becoming the first Flagler baseball player to reach the Major Leagues. He played in thirteen games for the Brewers before returning to the Sounds. He spent the remainder of the 2006 season and the entire 2007 season at Nashville. He became a free agent after the 2007 season.

Florida Marlins
In January 2008, the Florida Marlins signed Barnwell to a minor league contract with an invitation to spring training. Chris was selected as a 2008 Triple-A Pacific Coast League All-Star. He became a free agent at the end of the season.

Houston Astros
He signed a minor league contract with the Houston Astros in December 2008. In April 2009, Barnwell was traded to the Pittsburgh Pirates.

Pittsburgh Pirates
In April 2009, Barnwell was traded to the Pittsburgh Pirates and reported to Triple-A Indianapolis.

International career
He was the starting shortstop and leadoff hitter for Team Canada at the 2009 World Baseball Classic. His father is Canadian making him eligible for the Canadian team. Team Canada lost both of their pool C and were eliminated early from the tournament.

References

External links

1979 births
Living people
Albuquerque Isotopes players
American people of Canadian descent
Baseball players from Florida
Beloit Snappers players
Flagler Saints baseball players
High Desert Mavericks players
Huntsville Stars players
Indianapolis Indians players
Major League Baseball second basemen
Major League Baseball shortstops
Major League Baseball third basemen
Milwaukee Brewers players
Nashville Sounds players
Ogden Raptors players
World Baseball Classic players of Canada
2009 World Baseball Classic players